The America House (Amerika Haus, plural: Amerika Häuser) is an institution developed following the end of the Second World War to provide an opportunity for German and Austrian citizens to learn more about American culture and politics, and engage in discussion and debate on the transatlantic relationship. Run by the American government until 2006, Amerika Häuser were located in Frankfurt, Berlin, Heidelberg, Munich, Vienna and other cities. During the Vietnam War, German student protests in Berlin often took place in front of the America Haus.

List of Amerika Häuser

 Amerika-Haus Frankfurt (closed in 2006)

 Amerika Haus Berlin
 Amerikazentrum Hamburg 
 Amerika Haus Hannover
 Bayerisches Amerikahaus, München
 Carl-Schurz-Haus Freiburg
 Deutsch-Amerikanisches Institut Heidelberg
 Deutsch-Amerikanisches Institut Saarbrücken
 Deutsch-Amerikanisches Institut Sachsen, Leipzig
 Deutsch-Amerikanisches Institut Tübingen
 Deutsch-Amerikanisches Zentrum/James F. Byrnes Institute, Stuttgart
 German-American Institute, Nuremberg
 John F. Kennedy Haus, Darmstadt

See also 
 Gerhard Fauth
Patricia van Delden

References

External links
Official site (English version)

Transatlantic cultural exchange
 
Germany–United States relations